Quchemi (also Romanized as Qūchemī; also known as Gardangāh-e Qūchemī, Kuchimi, Kūshemī, Qūchī-ye Nāmdār, and Qūchmī-ye Nāmdār) is a village in Homeyl Rural District, Homeyl District, Eslamabad-e Gharb County, Kermanshah Province, Iran. At the 2006 census, its population was 384, in 82 families.

References 

Populated places in Eslamabad-e Gharb County